Yelena Yegorovna Gorchakova (17 May 1933 – 27 January 2002) was a Russian javelin thrower who won bronze medals at the 1952 and 1964 Olympics. Her 1964 bronze was a disappointment as she set a world record in the qualification that remained unbeaten for eight years.

During her long career Gorchakova had a fierce competition within the Soviet national team and won the national title only twice, in 1963 and 1965. As a result, despite being a world's top thrower she rarely competed internationally. Gorchakova won the javelin event at the 1961 Summer Universiade and finished fourth at the 1966 European Championships. She retired shortly thereafter.

References

1933 births
2002 deaths
Russian female javelin throwers
Soviet female javelin throwers
Olympic bronze medalists for the Soviet Union
Athletes (track and field) at the 1952 Summer Olympics
Athletes (track and field) at the 1964 Summer Olympics
Olympic athletes of the Soviet Union
Burevestnik (sports society) athletes
Medalists at the 1964 Summer Olympics
Medalists at the 1952 Summer Olympics
Olympic bronze medalists in athletics (track and field)
Universiade medalists in athletics (track and field)
Universiade gold medalists for the Soviet Union
Medalists at the 1961 Summer Universiade